Lewman Arthur Lane (October 17, 1899 – December 24, 1980) was an American football  and basketball coach.  He was the 24th head football coach at Washburn University in Topeka, Kansas, serving for one season, in 1945, and compiling a record of 3–1. He had previously coached at Rockhurst University in Kansas City, Missouri before coming to Washburn. He returned there to coach football again in 1947.

Lane was a druggist who managed a family drugstore founded by his father, Daniel J. Lane, in St. Mary's Township, Kansas. He died in 1980.

Head coaching record

Football

References

External links
 

1899 births
1980 deaths
Basketball coaches from Kansas
Creighton University alumni
Rockhurst Hawks football coaches
Rockhurst Hawks men's basketball coaches
Washburn Ichabods football coaches
People from St. Marys, Kansas